Anders Svor (December 14, 1864 – May 2, 1929) was a Norwegian sculptor. He was a realist influenced by Romanticism, and Auguste Rodin was also an important inspiration. His work was also part of the sculpture event in the art competition at the 1924 Summer Olympics.

Life
Svor was a farmer's son, the child of Rasmus Kristofer Svor (1835–1914) and Ragnhild Svor née Seljeset (1834–1902). He was born and raised at the Svor farm in Hornindal. Already as a boy he showed unusual abilities in wood carving, which would be the start of his artist life.

At the age of 17, he traveled to Kristiania (now Oslo), where he began as a woodcutter at the Hals Brothers piano factory. Later he became a student at the Royal Drawing School (now the Norwegian National Academy of Craft and Art Industry), where he studied under Julius Middelthun. At the age of 21 he went to Copenhagen, where he became a student at the Royal Danish Academy of Fine Arts and studied under Stephan Sinding and Vilhelm Bissen.

Svor lived for a time in Paris, but settled in Kristiania, where he had his studio and residence. He lived alone and died on May 2, 1929. He is buried at Hornindal Church.

In his native Hornindal, the Anders Svor Museum was opened in the village of Grodås in 1953. It contains about 450 works by the artist.

Career
Svor participated in several art exhibitions in Kristiania, Copenhagen, Paris, and Chicago. Svor experienced his great breakthrough with his sculpture David. At an international art exhibition in Berlin in 1891, he received a gold medal for this work of art, a prestigious award. The statue was destroyed while being shipped from an exhibit in Chicago. Together with Sofus Madsen, Svor participated in the 1924 Summer Olympics in Paris with his sculpture Diskoskaster (Discus Thrower).

In 1891 Svor won the competition for the Tordenskjold monument in Kristiania. However, he was unable to complete it, which was a difficult blow for the young artist. After his death, Svor's Tordenskiold-statuen (Tordenskjold Statue) was unveiled by King Olav V in Horten, and a copy was unveiled by Crown Prince Harald at Haakonsvern.

Regarding Svor's sculpture Bølgen (The Wave) exhibited at Skillebekk and Etter badet (After the Bath) outside Bislet Baths, the novelist Edvard Hoem wrote that he was struck by what the statues express; that they have "both excitement and grace." According to Hoem, Svor's work was overshadowed by the dominant sculptor Gustav Vigeland. The writer Morten Johan Svendsen writes that Svor's figurative imagery seems "both outdated and foreign today," while both Svendsen and the writer Inge Fænn believe that Svor was one of Norway's foremost sculptors after Vigeland.

Sculptures

 Tordenskiold-statuen (Tordenskjold Statue) at the Naval Officers Club in Horten, unveiled by King Olav V, copy at Haakonsvern unveiled by Crown Prince Harald
 Bolgen (The Wave), a.k.a. Havfruefontenen (The Mermaid Fountain) at Skillebekk in Oslo
 David, a prize-winning work at a competition in Berlin
 Christian Michelsen and Oscar II at the Anders Svor Museum
 Etter badet (After the Bath) at Bislet Baths in Oslo
 Statue of Svend Foyn in Tønsberg 
 Bust of Bjørnstjerne Bjørnson
 Bust of Christian Michelsen
 Bust of Henrik Ibsen
 Bust of Wollert Konow
 Bust of Fridtjof Nansen

References

Further reading
 Olav Gullvåg & P. O. Svor. 1954. Anders Svor og Svor-museet. Oslo: Eige.
 Morten Johan Svendsen. 2014. Anders Svor: Skulpturar i utval. Leikanger: Skald forlag.
 Inge Fænn. 2014. Anders Svor. Bilethoggaren frå Hornindal. Førde: Selja forlag.

1864 births
1929 deaths
19th-century Norwegian sculptors
20th-century Norwegian sculptors
Norwegian woodcarvers
People from Hornindal
Olympic competitors in art competitions